José Antonio Mora Otero (22 November 1897 – 26 January 1975) was a Uruguayan lawyer and diplomat.

Antonio Mora served as the secretary general of the Organization of American States between 16 January 1956 and 18 May 1968.  Before retiring from politics, Mora served as Uruguay's Minister of Foreign Relations, a senior minister responsible for International relations, from 1971 to 1972.

External links
Biography (OAS)

1897 births
1975 deaths
Uruguayan people of Spanish descent
Place of birth missing
Foreign ministers of Uruguay
Secretaries General of the Organization of American States